Tony Gordon Bland (born 19 July 1941) is a former English cricketer.  Bland was a right-handed batsman who bowled right-arm fast-medium.  He was born in Ranworth, Norfolk.

Bland made his debut for Norfolk in the 1965 Minor Counties Championship against Lincolnshire.  Bland played Minor counties cricket for Norfolk from 1965 to 1967, which included 18 Minor Counties Championship matches.  He made his only List A appearance in 1968 against Cheshire in the Gillette Cup.  In this match, he was dismissed for 7 runs by Arthur Sutton, while with the ball he took the wicket of Stuart Wood for the cost of 29 runs from 12 overs.

References

External links
Gordon Bland at ESPNcricinfo
Gordon Bland at CricketArchive

1941 births
Living people
People from Broadland (district)
English cricketers
Norfolk cricketers
Sportspeople from Norfolk